Wayne Thompson (born 19 March 1984) is an English rugby union player who played as a prop for Bristol and is a product of Bristol's Academy.

Thompson was a Captain of Marlwood School in South Gloucestershire and later attended Bristol University and then Oxford University, gaining a rugby blue in 2008.

In March 2008, he signed a two-year contract with Bristol before extending this in January 2010. The club did not reveal the length of the contract extension. Wayne spent most of his Bristol career falling over football nets and arranging the annual secret Santa events.

References

1984 births
Living people
English rugby union players
Bristol Bears players
Rugby union players from Bristol
Rugby union props